Luigi Garzya (born 7 July 1969) is a retired Italian professional footballer. During his career, he has played as a defender for A.S. Roma, A.S. Bari and Torino F.C.

References

1969 births
Living people
Italian footballers
Italy youth international footballers
Italy under-21 international footballers
Serie A players
Serie B players
Serie C players
U.S. Lecce players
Reggina 1914 players
A.S. Roma players
U.S. Cremonese players
S.S.C. Bari players
Torino F.C. players
F.C. Grosseto S.S.D. players
Taranto F.C. 1927 players
Association football defenders
Italian football managers